Fred Herd (26 November 1873 – 14 March 1954) was a Scottish professional golfer from St Andrews. In 1898 he won the fourth U.S. Open at Myopia Hunt Club, in South Hamilton, Massachusetts. This was the first U.S. Open to be played over 72 holes, requiring the competitors to play eight rounds of Myopia's nine-hole course. Herd turned in a card totaling 328, 84-85-75-84, averaging 82 strokes per 18-hole round.

Early life
Herd was born at St Andrews, Scotland on 26 November 1873. He emigrated to the United States in 1897, became a naturalized citizen, and that same year was posted as the professional at the Washington Park course in Chicago. He and his brother James were boarding at the Chicago home of Ellen McNulty and her family in 1900.

Golf career

1898 U.S. Open
He won a $150 prize for winning the 1898 U.S. Open—a large sum of money at the time—but such was his reputation as a drinker that he was not allowed to take the U.S. Open trophy away until he had paid a deposit, as the USGA was worried that he might pawn it to buy alcohol.

Herd played in the U.S. Open on three other occasions, but did not have any other top ten finishes. His brother, Sandy Herd, won The Open Championship in 1902. Two of Herd's other brothers, Alex and Davy, also played in the 1898 U.S. Open but did not finish in the top 10.

Death and legacy
Herd died on 14 March 1954. He is best remembered for winning the 1898 U.S. Open.

Major championships

Wins (1)

Results timeline
Herd played only in the U.S. Open.

DNP = Did not play
"T" indicates a tie for a place
Green background for wins. Yellow background for top-10

References

Scottish male golfers
Golfers from St Andrews
Winners of men's major golf championships
1873 births
1954 deaths